The Magnetococcales were an order of Alphaproteobacteria, but now the mitochondria are considered as sister to the alphaproteobactera, together forming the sister the marineproteo1 group, together forming the sister to Magnetococcidae.

See also 
 List of bacterial orders
 List of bacteria genera

References 

Alphaproteobacteria
Bacteria orders